Aleksei Aleksandrovich Sudarikov (born 1 May 1971) is a former Russian football player.

Club career
He played for many Russian clubs including FC Lada-Togliatti Togliatti and FC Seoul of the South Korean K League, then known as LG Cheetahs.

His younger brother Pavel Sudarikov also was a footballer.

References

External links
 

1971 births
People from Lyubertsy
Living people
Association football midfielders
Soviet footballers
Russian footballers
Russian expatriate footballers
Expatriate footballers in Hungary
Expatriate footballers in South Korea
Expatriate footballers in Belarus
Russian Premier League players
K League 1 players
FC FShM Torpedo Moscow players
FC Tyumen players
Kaposvári Rákóczi FC players
FC Lada-Tolyatti players
FC Seoul players
FC Lokomotiv Nizhny Novgorod players
FC Dynamo Stavropol players
FC Moscow players
FC Khimki players
FC Dynamo Brest players
FC Asmaral Moscow players
Sportspeople from Moscow Oblast